Circuit Makati is a riverfront redevelopment project by Ayala Land on the site of the former Santa Ana Race Track in Makati, Metro Manila, Philippines. The  site located in the northwest portion of Makati, on the south bank of the Pasig River, is planned to contain a mixed-use entertainment complex which would include an indoor theater, a shopping mall, hotels and residential and office skyscrapers. It would also contain a football turf, skate park and an outdoor entertainment area. The development is envisioned to become the new entertainment district of Makati and the city's lifestyle hub.

Location
Circuit Makati occupies a large portion of barangay Carmona. It is bounded by the Pasig River on the north, Hippodromo Street on the south, Fortuna Street to the east, and A.P. Reyes Avenue (which connects to Chino Roces Avenue) and H. Santos Street to the west. The district of Santa Ana in Manila, where Santa Ana Church and some of Santa Ana's historic houses are found, is within a few kilometers from the site.

Background
Circuit Makati had been occupied by the Santa Ana Park, a horse racetrack which operated from 1937 to 2008. Built in the Art Deco style, the racetrack was home to the Santa Ana Turf Club, the forerunner of what is now the Philippine Racing Club which introduced thoroughbred horse racing in the country. Prior to its establishment as a sporting and recreation facility, the site was home to the Santa Ana Cabaret, a dance hall and music venue for Manila's high society in the early 1900s.

In 2009, a year after the hippodrome was closed, the Philippine Racing Club opened its new home in the Santa Ana Park (Saddle and Clubs Leisure Park) in Naic, Cavite. The club then entered into a joint venture agreement with Ayala Land and its subsidiary, Alveo Land, in 2011 for the development of the property.

Buildings and facilities
 Globe Circuit Events Ground, a  outdoor venue that can accommodate 20,000 people for concerts, dance performances, fashion shows and sporting events.
 Santiago and Libertad Cua Park, a park at the riverbank of the Pasig River
 GOMO Skate Park, an approximately  skate area covered with concrete skateboard ramps
 Circuit Corporate Center, which consist of two office buildings with a total gross leasable area of 
 Ayala Malls Circuit, a lifestyle center by Ayala Malls
 Circuit Lane, a retail walk that will cross the entire length of the district
 Power Mac Center Spotlight, a 300-seater performance venue on top of Circuit Lane
 Samsung Performing Arts Theater, a 1,500-seat indoor performing arts theater
 St. John Paul II Chapel, a Roman Catholic chapel
 Circuit Makati Blue Pitch (formerly Gatorade Chelsea FC Blue Pitch), a  artificial football pitch 
 The Stiles Enterprise Plaza, an office-condominium by Alveo Land consisting of two towers
 Solstice, a residential condominium tower by Alveo Land. 
 Callisto, a residential condominium tower by Alveo Land.
 S&R Membership Shopping Circuit Makati
 Circuit Makati Transport Terminal, a known bus terminus of point-to point (P2P) buses going to SM Southmall and Nuvali in Santa Rosa, Laguna; and electric jeepney going to Mandaluyong.
 Astela, a residential condominium tower by Alveo Land.

See also
 San Lazaro Tourism and Business Park

References

External links
 Official website of Circuit Makati

Makati
Mixed-use developments in Metro Manila
Planned communities in the Philippines
Redeveloped ports and waterfronts in the Philippines
Pasig River